Taenioides purpurascens, the purple eelgoby, is a species of mud-dwelling bony fish native to Australia.

References 

purpurascens
Fish described in 1884